David Alan Lloyd (born 3 January 1948) is a former professional English tennis player and entrepreneur.

He was born in Leigh-on-Sea, Essex. He and his younger brother John Lloyd became two of the most successful British tennis players throughout the 1970s and 1980s. David captained the British Davis Cup team and became a leading figure in the Lawn Tennis Association.

For a short time he was chairman of Hull City A.F.C. and Hull FC. He also played a major part in making Tim Henman a world top 10 tennis player.

Tennis career

David Lloyd grew up in Westcliff-on-Sea near Southend and began playing tennis at Westcliff Hard LTC, where his parents were members, together with his brothers Tony and John. To make a little pocket money he would string rackets for the club. At 14 he was one of the best schoolboy players in the country and just a year later he started playing full-time on the tennis circuit. With little money he had to hitchhike to tournaments and earned extra cash by stringing rackets for his rivals.

In 1965 he won both singles and doubles titles at Junior Wimbledon and the following year was runner up in the junior singles. In 1972, he reached the last 32 at Wimbledon, losing to Australian former world No. 1, John Newcombe. 
He was a member of Great Britain’s Davis Cup squad between 1972-1974, and again between 1976-1980, and in 1978, was part of the first British team to reach the final since 1937. In 1976, he and his brother John achieved success together, winning a doubles title in London.

He retired from professional tennis in 1981, having attained a career-high of No. 128 in the world singles rankings (September 1973) and 40 in the world doubles ranking (August 1977).

He was appointed British Davis Cup captain in 1995 and went on to become a leading figure in the Lawn Tennis Association. He coached Tim Henman and was instrumental in his becoming British number 1 and a world top ten player.

David Lloyd Leisure

Following his retirement from professional tennis, Lloyd worked for a number of years as a coach at a tennis club in Canada. It was here that he hatched the idea of creating his own tennis and health club in the UK and on his return to Britain he founded the David Lloyd Leisure Clubs, opening the first club in Heston, near Hounslow in west London, in 1982. It was a pioneering concept in health and fitness: family-oriented clubs with an emphasis on tennis.

The business was floated on the London Stock Exchange in 1992 and by 1995, there were 18 David Lloyd Leisure clubs, when Whitbread Plc acquired the company for a reported £200 million, a record in the City at that time, incorporating it into its Restaurants & Leisure Division. Lloyd remained as managing director of the division until 1996.

Lloyd, together with his son Scott, went on to create Next Generation fitness clubs and in 2007, London & Regional Properties in partnership with Bank of Scotland, acquired David Lloyd Leisure from Whitbread and incorporated Next Generation into the group, in a deal worth £925 million.

In 2013 the group was taken over by TDR Capital and now includes 89 UK and European David Lloyd Leisure Clubs, two exclusive Harbour Clubs and five David Lloyd Studios, with a membership of around 440,000 and employing some 6,000 staff.

Property and other businesses

Following the sale of the leisure business, Lloyd turned his attention to real estate and developed the Sugar Hill Resort in Barbados.

Lloyd was later involved in the development of a luxury estate in Phuket, Thailand and the building of a luxury villa near Marbella in Spain.

In May 2007, Lloyd bought the collection of artist Willard Wigan, estimated to be valued at £11.2 million.

In 2018 Lloyd backed EdTech Business Toppa originally Founded by John Loveday and Paul Hood. Toppa has 11 Exec Board Members and boasts over £1million worth of pre-orders after just 12 months. Lloyd is a key shareholder in Toppa and a member of the board

Career titles

Doubles (1 title, 2 runner-ups)

References

External links
 
 
 
 David Lloyd Health Clubs
 Next Generation Clubs Australia
 David Lloyd Signature Homes

English football chairmen and investors
English male tennis players
Hull City A.F.C. directors and chairmen
People from Leigh-on-Sea
Tennis people from Essex
1948 births
Living people
People from Oxshott
British male tennis players